The 2009 Mordovia Cup was a professional tennis tournament played on outdoor red clay courts. It was the seventh edition of the tournament which was part of the 2009 ATP Challenger Tour. It took place in Saransk, Russia between 27 July and 2 August 2009.

Singles entrants

Seeds

 Rankings are as of July 20, 2009.

Other entrants
The following players received wildcards into the singles main draw:
  Nikoloz Basilashvili
  Evgeny Donskoy
  Vladislav Dubinsky
  Anton Manegin

The following players received entry from the qualifying draw:
  Mikhail Ledovskikh
  Denis Matsukevich
  Denys Molchanov
  Vitali Reshetnikov
  Artem Sitak (as a Lucky Loser)

Champions

Singles

 Iñigo Cervantes-Huegun def.  Jonathan Dasnières de Veigy, 7–5, 6–4

Doubles

 Michail Elgin /  Evgeny Kirillov def.  Alexey Kedryuk /  Denis Matsukevich, 6–1, 6–2

External links
ITF Search 
2009 Draws

Mordovia Cup
Mordovia Cup
2009 in Russian tennis